Gehrke is a German surname. Notable people with the surname include:

Axel Gehrke (1942–2021), German politician
Bruce Gehrke (1924–1976), American football player and coach
Charles W. Gehrke (1917–2009), American chemist
Chris Gehrke (1966–1991), American racing driver
Erwin Gehrke (1898–1966), American football player
Fred Gehrke (1918–2002), American football player and executive
Hans-Joachim Gehrke (born 1945), German archaeologist
Herbert Gehrke (1910–1945), German Nazi activist and SA commander
Holger Gehrke (born 1960), German footballer and manager
Johannes Gehrke (contemporary), German scientist
Mai Gehrke (born 1964), Danish mathematician
Michael Gehrke (contemporary), American political consultant
Roland Gehrke (born 1954), East German sport wrestler
Steve Gehrke (born 1971), American poet

Surnames from given names
German-language surnames